Zombie! vs. Mardi Gras is a 1999 independently produced comedy horror film directed by Karl DeMolay, Will Frank, and Mike Lyddon. It stars Dale Ashmun, Loreli Fuller, John Sinclair, Jeanette Hauser, and Veronica Russell.

Synopsis
The opening scenes of the film center on MacGuffin, a deranged occultist whose life has been dedicated to vengeance after being trampled and rendered a paraplegic as a child by overzealous Mardi Gras revelers in the throes of bead-catching madness. With the help of a Sumerian Goddess, MacGuffin performs a ritual that raises Zombie! (exclamation point mandatory) from his grave. Zombie! embarks on a killing spree in New Orleans during the Mardi Gras festivities. A trio of filmmakers get word of this and hasten to capture Zombie! on film. Renaissance genius Galileo, newly pardoned by Pope John Paul II and thus released from Purgatory, also chases Zombie! through New Orleans' crowded streets. Meanwhile, a zaftig ninja vows to take down the undead menace. The film is peppered with comedy sketches and sight gags more or less unrelated to the plot, including numerous shots of bare-breasted women flashing the Mardi Gras crowds.

Cast
 Dale Ashmun
 Lorelei Fuller
 John Sinclair
 Jeanette Hauser
 Veronica Russell

Release
Zombie! vs. Mardi Gras was originally direct-to-video. It received a theatrical release in New York in April 2001. The film mainly played in non-theatrical venues after its initial release.

The film was re-mastered, with noticeable improvements to sound quality, and released on DVD in February 2006 by the filmmakers.

Reception
The film was negatively reviewed by many online sites, which called it "the worst film ever made," but it had a positive reception at the New York Underground Film Festival.  Rotten Tomatoes, a review aggregator, reports that 20% of ten surveyed critics gave the film a positive review; the average rating is 2.5/10.  Metacritic rated it 12/100 based on five reviews.  James Berardinelli proclaimed it "the worst professionally produced film I have had the displeasure of sitting through." Berardinelli goes on to mention that "after enduring 'Zombie! Vs. Mardi Gras,' you will have a clear appreciation of which films are truly bad and which ones are just unimaginative and lifeless."  David Sterritt of The Christian Science Monitor wrote, "Fans of unregenerate underground moviemaking will have a ball, and there's a creepy charm to the picture's proudly homemade quality."  Lawrence Van Gelder of The New York Times called it "amateurish and incoherent."  Brian Bertoldo of Film Threat rated it 3/5 stars and wrote, "There’s not much of a plot here, just sheer absurdity. In a way the film is amusing for what it is, once I figured that out."  Maitland McDonagh of TV Guide called it a parody of horror comedy films that has pre-fabricated cult appeal.  Writing in The Zombie Movie Encyclopedia, academic Peter Dendle called it "a postmodern Art Zombie movie" that is "little more than an excuse for a bunch of film school students to hit New Orleans."

References

External links
 
 
 
 An early review that went viral

1999 films
1990s comedy horror films
1999 direct-to-video films
American comedy horror films
American independent films
American parody films
1990s English-language films
Films shot in New Orleans
Films set in New Orleans
Parodies of horror
1999 comedy films
1999 independent films
1990s American films
American zombie comedy films